National figure skating championships of the 2016–17 season are taking place mostly between November 2016 and February 2017. Medals may be awarded in the disciplines of men's singles, ladies' singles, pair skating, and ice dancing.

Competitions 
Key

Medalists

Men

Ladies

Pairs

Ice dancing

References

Nationals
Nationals
Figure skating national championships